Frankie DeCarlos is the second studio album by American recording artist Frankie DeCarlos.

Track listing

2008 albums